Tahamouni is Najwa Karam's 12th studio album.

Track listing
1. Bara'ah (Acquittal)
2. Ew'a Tekoun Ze'alt (I Hope You're Not Mad at Me)
3. Ya Medawebni (Oh, You Who Consumed Me)
4. Tahamouni (They Accused Me)
5. Benoub (Never)
6. Temasken (He Played the Humble)
7. Be Gharamak Masloubi (Drawn into Your Passion)
8. El Omr Meshwar (Life is a Journey)
9. Ya Medawebni (Instrumental)

External links
  Music Video
 English translation of the song Benoub

2002 albums
Najwa Karam albums